Jonathan Paul Losman (born March 12, 1981) is an American football coach and former quarterback. Losman played in the National Football League (NFL) for seven seasons, primarily with the Buffalo Bills. He played college football at UCLA and Tulane and was drafted by the Bills in the first round (22nd overall) in the 2004 NFL Draft.

Intended to replace Drew Bledsoe as Buffalo's franchise quarterback, Losman was plagued with inconsistent play, injuries, and consistent coaching turnover during his stint with the team, and he was eventually replaced by Trent Edwards. Losman's Bills career was considered a disappointment due to the fact he was taken in the same round of the draft as Eli Manning, Philip Rivers, and Ben Roethlisberger, who all went on to have successful careers as franchise quarterbacks with their teams.

Upon leaving the Bills, Losman signed with the Las Vegas Locomotives in the upstart United Football League, leading the team to winning the inaugural UFL championship game before finishing out his career with stints with the Oakland Raiders, Seattle Seahawks, and Miami Dolphins.

College career
After a notable high school career at Venice High School in Los Angeles, where he earned Parade All-American honors and was rated the No. 3 quarterback in the nation by PrepStar magazine, Losman accepted an athletic scholarship to attend college at University of California, Los Angeles (UCLA).  He enrolled early during the spring quarter of 1999, in order to compete for the starting quarterback position.  Losman wanted to be named the starting quarterback. However, UCLA informed him that he would not be the starter, and he transferred.

Losman eventually transferred to Tulane University in New Orleans to play for then-head coach Chris Scelfo, who had made a late recruiting run at him just prior to his committing to UCLA.

After sitting out the 1999 season due to NCAA transfer rules, Losman served as the backup quarterback for two seasons behind future NFL 1st round pick Patrick Ramsey. Losman would see spot starter's duty in his first two seasons. He passed for 299 yards and 2 touchdowns in his first start against East Carolina during his freshman season. In 2002, his first year as a full-time starter, Losman led the Green Wave to an 8-5 record and a 36-28 victory in the inaugural Hawaii Bowl against the host-team Hawaii Warriors. Following a 3-1 start in the 2003 season, Tulane suffered multiple injuries that depleted its already thin depth on defense, and slumped to a 5-7 finish. Losman completed his collegiate career having completed 570 of 987 passes (57.7 percent) for 6,754 yards, 60 touchdowns, and 27 interceptions. He also ran for 241 yards, with 10 scores on 237 carries.

While at Tulane, he earned a political science degree with a minor in media arts.

Professional career

Buffalo Bills

2004
After the Buffalo Bills selected University of Wisconsin wide receiver Lee Evans with the 13th pick of the 2004 Draft, the Bills traded back into the first round by trading their second round pick to the Dallas Cowboys and selected Losman with the 22nd pick in the first round of the NFL Draft. He was the first quarterback to be drafted by the Bills in the first round since 1983, when the team drafted Jim Kelly. Like Kelly, Losman was drafted in a quarterback-rich class, and was the fourth (and final) quarterback taken in the first round that year, following Eli Manning, Philip Rivers, and Ben Roethlisberger.

Losman's NFL career got off to a shaky start during his first training camp when teammate Troy Vincent ran into Losman and broke his leg in a freak accident. Losman suffered a broken left fibula, which delayed his development as a rookie. He eventually recovered and saw limited action in the 2004 NFL season, appearing briefly in three games and completing 3-of-5 passes for 32 yards and 1 interception while backing up Drew Bledsoe. Following the Bills' February 2005 release of Bledsoe, Losman was named the team's starting quarterback by head coach Mike Mularkey. He proceeded to say that Bledsoe was "unfit for the Bills".

2005
In the first game of the 2005 season (Losman's first professional start), Losman led the Bills to a 22-7 victory over the Houston Texans. Losman subsequently struggled with his accuracy and, consequently, his confidence; with those struggles followed consecutive Bills losses. This eventually led the Bills to bench Losman in favor of veteran quarterback Kelly Holcomb in the fifth game of the 2005 season. After Holcomb suffered a head injury in the first quarter of the Bills' Week 10 game against the Kansas City Chiefs, Losman returned to the lineup and threw two quick touchdown strikes to Lee Evans, leading the Bills to a 14-3 victory. The Bills went on to lose all but one of their remaining games in 2005 with Holcomb and Losman splitting time under center.

2006
The Bills cleaned house during the following off-season, with changes in management and the coaching staff. Marv Levy, the team's new general manager and former Bills head coach, and Dick Jauron, the new head coach, planned to have Losman compete for the starting job against Holcomb and free-agent signee Craig Nall. Losman won the job during the preseason.

Losman was considered by many to be a bust until his much-improved 2006 season, in which he threw 19 touchdowns and 14 interceptions in 16 games, with 300-yard games against the New York Jets and Houston Texans. Losman led last-minute, fourth quarter scoring drives to beat the Texans and Jacksonville Jaguars. Losman had a 62.5 completion percentage for the season, a record for Buffalo Bill quarterbacks in a full 16-game season. He was rated the 11th best passer in the NFL, with an 84.9 passer rating.

Losman's performance over the last half of the 2006 season was greatly improved. However, the offense as a whole was hurt by a below-average rushing attack that created many third down and long situations. After the season, the Bills traded Willis McGahee to the Baltimore Ravens and drafted University of California running back Marshawn Lynch with the 12th overall selection of the 2007 Draft and Fresno State College running back Dwayne Wright in the 4th round.

Losman was also mired behind a sieve-like offensive line for most of the first half of the 2006 season; subsequent personnel changes made during the Bills bye week resulted in improved offensive line play and, consequently, more improved and consistent production from Losman. Following the season, the Bills further bolstered their offensive line in free agency, signing guard Derrick Dockery, right tackle Langston Walker, and guard/center Jason Whittle.

2007

The Bills drafted Stanford University quarterback Trent Edwards with the 92nd overall pick in the 2007 NFL Draft. Edwards was considered by many to be the 3rd best available quarterback prospect in the draft (behind #1 overall JaMarcus Russell and #22 overall Brady Quinn), but waited until late in the 3rd round prior to the Bills selection. After the draft, statements from both Bills' coaching staff and management reaffirmed Losman's position as the starting quarterback.

For 2007, Buffalo offensive coordinator Steve Fairchild indicated that with the improved offensive line he plans to employ a more wide-open offense utilizing multiple wide receiver sets and taking greater advantage of the running backs in the passing game.

On September 23, Losman suffered a grade one sprain of his left knee in the first series of plays in a game against New England. Losman was hit late after completing a four-yard pass to Marshawn Lynch by New England Patriots nose tackle Vince Wilfork, who was assessed a 15-yard roughing the passer penalty.

"It was just a simple swing pass to get an early completion. The guy came in, hit me in the knee," said Losman, who stayed in the game for two plays "I knew something was wrong from the get-go, but I figured I'd play a few plays and maybe the pain would go away."

Losman was out for the next two games and was available for the October 21 home game against the Baltimore Ravens, but Dick Jauron chose to give Edwards the nod, just for the week. Edwards performance impressed Jauron enough that on October 23, Trent Edwards was named the starting quarterback for the Bills, having won 2 of the 3 games he started. Reports surfaced, however, that many players on the team were unhappy about Losman losing his job. The reports continued to allege that team owner Ralph Wilson, Jr. wanted Losman benched so that he could not reach the statistical milestones needed for his bonus.

In an October 28, 2007 game at the New York Jets, Edwards injured his wrist and was replaced by Losman. Losman led the Bills on two consecutive scoring drives, including one that ended with an 85-yard touchdown pass to wide receiver Lee Evans. Starting the next game for injured Trent Edwards, Losman threw for almost 300 yards and one touchdown to lead the Bills to a win. He started three more games before being benched again for Edwards.

At the end of the season, Losman was upset about losing his job to Edwards and wanted to be traded, but said he would play out the season if necessary.

2008
Though he wanted to be traded, Losman continued playing for the Bills in 2008, filling in for an injured Trent Edwards intermittently throughout the season with limited success. The team did not win a game with Losman as the starter, including a game in which he lost a fumble to the New York Jets defense that resulted in the Jets' game-winning touchdown.

Losman's contract expired at the end of the 2008 season and the Bills made no effort to keep him, instead replacing him with Ryan Fitzpatrick.

Looking back at Losman's stint with Buffalo, former Bills vice president of player personnel John Guy was quoted as saying "J.P. never had a fair chance. I'll never forget his first day of practice and they were blitzing him every which way. I remember saying, 'This isn’t the way to break in a quarterback.'" In his five-year stint with the team, Losman had three different offensive coordinators.

Las Vegas Locomotives
Losman was signed by the Las Vegas Locomotives of the UFL. He signed with the Locomotives on July 21, 2009. On November 27, 2009, he helped the Locomotives win the inaugural UFL Championship. Losman recorded 9 touchdowns and two interceptions on 1,193 passing yards for the Locomotives in 2009.

Losman worked out for the Indianapolis Colts on December 4, 2009, after their backup quarterback Jim Sorgi was injured in practice.

Oakland Raiders
With injury to starting quarterback Bruce Gradkowski, the Oakland Raiders signed Losman on December 15, 2009.

Losman made his first Oakland, California appearance against the Denver Broncos on December 20, 2009, throwing one incomplete pass after both QBs Charlie Frye and JaMarcus Russell suffered injuries and had to leave the game.

Seattle Seahawks
On May 18, 2010, Losman signed with the Seattle Seahawks. He was released on September 4. On November 10, 2010, Seattle Seahawks head coach Pete Carroll reported on Sirius Radio that the Seahawks had signed Losman again. Losman participated in the January 8, 2011, playoff game between the Seahawks and the New Orleans Saints.

Miami Dolphins
The Miami Dolphins signed Losman on October 25, 2011. On December 11, he came in for injured quarterback Matt Moore in the third quarter. Losman retired after the end of the season.

Career statistics

NFL statistics

UFL statistics

Coaching career
Following his NFL career, Losman became a volunteer coach with the New Canaan High School football team after settling with his family in the Connecticut suburbs of New York City. His wife encouraged him to pursue a full-time coaching career after two years.

In 2017, Losman joined Clemson as a coaching intern. He eventually became an offensive coach, and in March 2019, while taking part in throwing drills at Clemson's Pro Day, was asked by an NFL scout if he would consider returning to the league despite not having played since 2011; Losman declined.

In 2022, Losman was hired as a Player Personnel and Football Administration Assistant at the University of Oklahoma.

References

External links
Seattle Seahawks bio
Just Sports Stats

 

1981 births
Living people
Players of American football from Los Angeles
American football quarterbacks
Tulane Green Wave football players
Buffalo Bills players
Las Vegas Locomotives players
Oakland Raiders players
Seattle Seahawks players
Miami Dolphins players
UCLA Bruins football players
American sportspeople of Mexican descent
Clemson Tigers football coaches
Venice High School (Los Angeles) alumni
Sports coaches from Los Angeles